Mud Lake is a lake in Greater Madawaska, Renfrew County in Eastern Ontario, Canada. It is in geographic Brougham Township, is part of the Saint Lawrence River drainage basin, and is the source of Little Black Donald Creek.

The lake has two unnamed inflows: one at the north, and a second at the east. The primary outflow is Little Black Donald Creek at the south, which flows via Black Donald Lake, the Madawaska River, and the Ottawa River to the Saint Lawrence River.

See also
List of lakes in Ontario

References

Lakes of Renfrew County